State Fair is a 1976 American made-for-television drama film loosely based on the 1932 novel of the same title by Phil Stong. It was broadcast on CBS on May 14, 1976, and starred Vera Miles as Melissa Bryant, the matriarch of the family.

It is the fourth film adaptation of the novel, the previous three having been released to theaters in 1933, 1945, and 1962. As in Stong's novel and previous film adaptations, the story involves an Iowa farm family who travel to the Iowa State Fair, where the son and daughter of the family each find romance. However, in the 1976 film, most of the character names were changed (the "Frakes" of the original novel became the "Bryants"), new son and grandson characters were added, and other aspects of the story were changed and updated to reflect the 1970s.

The 1976 version was made as a pilot episode for a television series, but the series was never produced. It has been included as a special feature on the DVD release of the 1945 film.

Plot
Melissa and Jim Bryant live on an Iowa farm with their adult son Chuck, their adult daughter Karen, and their teenage son Wayne, who is a high school sophomore. Wayne is a talented singer and guitarist who dreams of country music stardom. Karen, newly separated from her husband, has recently rejoined the family with her own young son Tommy, who misses his father.

The Bryants attend the Iowa State Fair, where Wayne enters the "Stars of Tomorrow" talent contest and falls in love with fellow competitor Bobbie Jean Shaw, who also aspires to a country music career in Nashville. Bobbie Jean, who may be using Wayne to further her own ambitions, pressures him to run away with her so they can pursue their musical dreams together. Meanwhile, Karen begins a new romance with her former classmate, David, after they run into each other at the fair.

Cast
Vera Miles as Melissa Bryant
Tim O'Connor as Jim Bryant
Mitch Vogel as Wayne Bryant
Julie Cobb as Karen Bryant Miller
Jeff Cotler as Tommy Miller
Dennis Redfield as Chuck Bryant
Linda Purl as Bobbie Jean Shaw
Joel Stedman as David Clemmans

References

External links
 
 
 

1976 television films
1976 films
1976 drama films
20th Century Fox Television films
American drama television films
CBS network films
Films directed by David Lowell Rich
Films scored by Laurence Rosenthal
Films scored by Lionel Newman
Films set in Iowa
Iowa State Fair
State Fair (franchise)
Television films as pilots
Television pilots not picked up as a series
1970s American films
1970s English-language films